Nashua is a city in southern New Hampshire, United States. At the 2020 census, it had a population of 91,322, the second-largest in northern New England after nearby Manchester. Along with Manchester, it is a seat of New Hampshire's most populous county, Hillsborough.

Built around the now-departed textile industry, in recent decades Nashua's economy has shifted to the financial services, high tech, and defense industries as part of the economic recovery that started in the 1980s in the Greater Boston region. Major private employers in the city include Nashua Corporation, BAE Systems, and Teradyne. The city also hosts two major regional medical centers, Southern New Hampshire Medical Center and St. Joseph Hospital. The South Nashua commercial district is a major regional shopping destination, lying directly on the Massachusetts border and taking advantage of New Hampshire's lack of sales tax. It is anchored by the Pheasant Lane Mall and numerous smaller shopping centers.

It is one of several U.S. cities nicknamed Gate City, which references a reputation for being a travel gateway - in this case between the Boston region and New Hampshire. A number of civic groups and institutions have adopted the title.

History
The area was part of a  tract of land in Massachusetts called "Dunstable", named after Edward Tyng of Dunstable in England. Located at the confluence of the Nashua and Merrimack rivers, Dunstable was first settled about 1654 as a fur trading town. Nashua lies approximately in the center of the original 1673 grant. In 1732, Dunstable was split along the Merrimack River, with the town of Nottingham West (now the town of Hudson, New Hampshire) created out of the eastern portion. The previously disputed boundary between Massachusetts and New Hampshire was fixed in 1741 when the governorships of the two provinces were separated. As a result, the township of Dunstable was divided in two. Tyngsborough and some of Dunstable remained in Massachusetts, while Dunstable, New Hampshire, was incorporated in 1746 from the northern section of the town.

Like many 19th century riverfront New England communities, New Hampshire's Dunstable was developed during the Industrial Revolution with textile mills operated from water power. In 1823, the Nashua Manufacturing Company was incorporated. The company eventually had four mills and employed approximately 1,000 people. The following year, the Jackson Manufacturing Company was incorporated.

In 1836, the New Hampshire half of Dunstable was renamed "Nashua", after the Nashua River; the Dunstable name lives on across the Massachusetts border. The Nashua River was named by the Nashaway people, and in the Penacook language it means "beautiful stream with a pebbly bottom", with an alternative meaning of "land between two rivers". In 1842, the town split into two towns. Eleven years later, they joined back together under the name "Nashua", and were re-incorporated as a city. During the split, the northern area, known today as "French Hill", called itself "Nashville", while the southern part kept the name Nashua.

Six railroad lines crossed the mill town, namely the Nashua and Lowell, Worcester and Nashua, Nashua and Acton, Nashua and Wilton, Concord and Nashua, and Rochester railroads.

Like the rival Amoskeag Manufacturing Company upriver in Manchester, the Nashua mills prospered until about World War I, after which a slow decline set in. Water power was replaced with newer forms of energy to run factories, such as coal, and cotton could be manufactured into fabric where it grew, saving transportation costs. The textile business started moving to the South during the Great Depression, with the last mill near Nashua closing in 1949.

But then Sanders Associates, a newly created defense firm that is now part of BAE Systems, moved into one of the closed mills and helped restart the city's economy. Sanders Associates also played a key role in the development of the home video game console market. Ralph H. Baer, an employee of Sanders, developed what would become the Magnavox Odyssey, the first commercial home video game system. The arrival of Digital Equipment Corp., now part of Hewlett-Packard, in the 1970s made the city part of the Boston-area high-tech corridor.

Geography

Nashua is in southeastern Hillsborough County. It is bordered to the south by Middlesex County, Massachusetts.

The eastern boundary of Nashua is formed by the Merrimack River, and the city is drained by the Nashua River and Salmon Brook, tributaries of the Merrimack. The Nashua River roughly bisects the city. Pennichuck Brook forms the city's northern boundary.

Climate
Nashua has a four-season humid continental climate (Köppen Dfb), with short spring and autumn transitions, long humid and warm summers, and cold winters full of snow. Spring and autumn in between are relatively brief transitions. On average, there are 9.4 days of + highs and 8.7 days of sub- lows. Precipitation is well-spread throughout the year, though winter is the driest.

Demographics

As of the census of 2010, there were 86,494 people, 35,044 households, and 21,876 families residing in the city.  The population density was 2,719.9 people per square mile (1,050.2/km2).  There were 37,168 housing units at an average density of 1,202.8 per square mile (464.6/km2).  The racial makeup of the city was 83.4% White, 2.7% African American, 0.3% Native American, 6.5% Asian, 0.03% Pacific Islander, 4.6% from some other race, and 2.5% from two or more races. Hispanic or Latino of any race were 9.8% of the population.

There were 35,044 households, out of which 28.7% had children under the age of 18 living with them, 45.9% were married couples living together, 11.6% had a female householder with no husband present, and 37.6% were non-families. 29.4% of all households were made up of individuals, and 9.6% had someone living alone who was 65 years of age or older.  The average household size was 2.42 and the average family size was 3.01.

In the city the population was spread out, with 22.1% under the age of 18, 9.3% from 18 to 24, 28.0% from 25 to 44, 27.8% from 45 to 64, and 12.7% who were 65 years of age or older.  The median age was 38.5 years. For every 100 females, there were 97.3 males.  For every 100 females age 18 and over, there were 95.8 males.

In 2011 the estimated median income for a household in the city was $60,923, and the median income for a family was $76,612. Male full-time workers had a median income of $60,365 versus $43,212 for females. The per capita income for the city was $30,937. About 4.6% of families and 9.3% of the population were below the poverty line, including 11.4% of those under age 18 and 5.9% of those age 65 or over.

Economy

Nashua has three main commercial districts. Centered on Main Street near the geographic center of the city, Downtown Nashua is the oldest of the commercial districts, featuring commercial, entertainment, and dining venues, near historic commercial buildings and homes as well. Recent plans have incorporated the Nashua River into the design of a pedestrian-friendly walkway. The downtown Nashua Riverwalk is a large, public/private venture funded through the use of tax increment financing (TIF). Amherst Street (Route 101A) is in the northwestern part of the city and is a large thoroughfare with commercial centers along both sides. The South Nashua Commercial District, centered on Daniel Webster Highway near the Massachusetts border, is anchored by the Pheasant Lane Mall, attracting many people from Massachusetts taking advantage of the lack of sales tax in New Hampshire.

The city is home to a number of technical firms, including Nashua Corporation, which took its name from the city and river. Nashua Corp. was a leading producer of floppy disks through the early 1990s, making the Nashua name well known in the world of personal computers.

Defense contractor BAE Systems (formerly Sanders Associates), computer firm Dell, and software company Oracle Corporation are the largest representatives of the high-tech industry prominent in the region. The Boston Air Route Traffic Control Center is in Nashua. The three-building campus that once housed a Digital Equipment Corporation software development facility was sold to the John Flatley Company, which has renamed it "Nashua Technology Park".

Sports
Nashua has had a series of amateur, semi-professional, and professional baseball teams. The Nashua Silver Knights, part of the Futures Collegiate Baseball League of New England (FCBL), is the city's current team. The Nashua Pride, a Can-Am minor league baseball team, played at Holman Stadium from 1998 through 2008, then changed to the American Defenders of New Hampshire in the 2009 season. The Defenders were evicted from the venue in August 2009, however, because of non-payment of rent, and moved to Pittsfield, Massachusetts to become the Pittsfield Colonials. Before the Pride, Holman was the home stadium for the independent Nashua Hawks; the AA Nashua Pirates; the AA Nashua Angels; and the A Nashua Dodgers, the first racially integrated professional baseball team in the 20th century.

In collegiate sports, Nashua is home to the Rivier University Raiders, who compete in the Great Northeast Athletic Conference (GNAC).

The Spartans Drum and Bugle Corps (1997, 1998, 2004, 2007 Drum Corps International Division II Champions and 2019 Open Class Champions) is based in Nashua.

Government

The city's government is headed by a mayor and fifteen aldermen: six at-large aldermen elected three at a time every four years, and nine ward aldermen, one for each ward in the city, elected every two years.

In the New Hampshire General Court, Nashua is represented in the House by Hillsborough County's 20th (Ward 1), 21st (Ward 2), 22nd (Ward 3), 23rd (Ward 4), 24th (Ward 6), 25th (Ward 7) and 26th (Wards 5, 8 and 9) districts and in the Senate by District 12 (Wards 1, 2, and 5, shared with Hollis, Mason, Brookline, Greenville, New Ipswich, and Rindge) and District 13 (Wards 3, 4, 6, 7, 8, and 9).

In the New Hampshire Senate, Nashua is represented by two state senators:
Republican Kevin Avard (District 12) – Wards 1–2, 5  
Democrat Cindy Rosenwald (District 13) – Wards 3–4, 6-9

In the New Hampshire Executive Council, Nashua is included within the 5th District and is currently represented by Republican Dave Wheeler. Nashua is included within New Hampshire's 2nd congressional district and is currently represented by Democrat Ann McLane Kuster in the U.S. House of Representatives.

At the presidential level, Nashua leans strongly towards Democrats. George H. W. Bush was the last Republican presidential nominee to win Nashua in 1988.

Education

In the 2000 U.S Census, 22,700 residents over age three were enrolled in a Nashua educational institution, approximately a fourth of the city.

Secondary schools

Public
 Nashua High School South (formerly Nashua High School, 1976–2004)
 Nashua High School North
 Brentwood Academy
Clearway Alternative High School

Private
 Bishop Guertin High School, a coeducational Catholic high school

Public charter school
 Academy for Science and Design

Middle schools

Public
 Elm Street Middle School
 Fairgrounds Middle School
 Pennichuck Middle School

Private
 Saint Christopher Academy (Upper Campus)
 World Academy

Elementary schools

Public
 Amherst Street Elementary School
 Bicentennial Elementary School
 Birch Hill Elementary School
 Broad Street Elementary School
 Charlotte Avenue Elementary School
 Dr. Norman W. Crisp Elementary School
 Fairgrounds Elementary School
 Ledge Street Elementary School
 Main Dunstable Elementary School
 Mount Pleasant Elementary School
 New Searles Elementary School
 Sunset Heights Elementary School

Colleges
 Nashua Community College (NCC)
 Granite State College, which shares a campus with NCC.
 Rivier University

former colleges
 Daniel Webster College (DWC): closed in May 2017.
 Southern New Hampshire University's Nashua campus

Media
The local newspaper is The Telegraph, with daily news published online and a weekly printed edition.

Nashua radio stations include oldies station WGHM 900 AM (ESPN affiliate), talk station WSMN 1590 AM, and 106.3 WFNQ, a classic hits station owned by Binnie Media. WEVS 88.3 and 90.3 serve as the stations for New Hampshire Public Radio. The city is part of the Manchester radio market and can also receive almost all Boston-market stations clearly.

One television station is licensed to Nashua. WBTS-CD (channel 15) is owned by NBC Owned Television Stations, and serves as the NBC owned-and-operated station for the Boston market. The station moved from its own transmitter to a channel share with PBS member station WGBX-TV from their Needham, Massachusetts tower in 2018 upon NBC's assumption of ownership, letting it broadcast the "NBC Boston" service (previously carried by a low-power station in Boston and subchannels of other stations) across the entire market. As WYCN-CD, it formerly carried a number of smaller networks, along with local programming and community calendar information of interest to Nashuans, until the sale to NBC.

Infrastructure

Transportation

Roads
The Everett Turnpike is the major highway running through the city. U.S. Route 3 follows the turnpike from the Massachusetts border north to Exit 7E, where it branches to the northeast along the two-lane Henri A. Burque Highway to Concord Street and then heads north into the town of Merrimack. Other New Hampshire state highways in the city include:
NH 101A, which enters the city from the northwest and follows Amherst Street to its terminus at Main Street.
NH 111, which enters the city from the southwest and follows Hollis Street to the city's eastern border at the Merrimack River, crossing into Hudson on the twin-span Taylor Falls/Veterans Memorial bridges.
NH 111A, which enters the city from the southwest and follows Groton Road to Main Dunstable Road to its terminus at Hollis Street.
NH 130, which enters the city from the west and follows Broad Street to its terminus at Amherst Street.

Maps of the Nashua area often show a stretch of freeway forming a circumferential highway through Nashua and the neighboring town of Hudson. Only a small section of the south end of this highway (Exit 2 off U.S. Route 3) has been built, and it is unclear whether the highway will ever be completed. If finished, the Nashua-Hudson Circumferential Highway would be part of the Everett Turnpike, and would rejoin the mainline highway at a hypothetical Exit 9 in northern Nashua.

In 2015, after four years of construction, the city completed the Broad Street Parkway, which connects Exit 6 of the Everett Turnpike to the city's downtown area ("Tree Streets" neighborhood), with the goal of easing traffic congestion and opening up Nashua's old mill-yard as part of the city's economic development. The new parkway provides a third crossing of the Nashua River and a way for traffic to avoid Library Hill, a busy downtown intersection. The idea of a road connecting Broad Street with Hollis Street within the city had been discussed since the 1960s.

Public transportation is provided by the Nashua Transit System, which has nine scheduled bus routes in the city. Boston Express, a subsidiary of Concord Coach Lines, operates a Nashua-Boston bus line that runs out of the Nashua Transit Center off Exit 8 on the Everett Turnpike. This line transports passengers to South Station and Logan International Airport in Boston.

Airports

Nashua Airport (Boire Field), a general aviation facility, is in the city's northwest corner. The nearest airports with scheduled airline service are Manchester–Boston Regional Airport in Manchester and Logan International Airport in Boston.

Past trolleys 
Historically, Nashua was a hub for the trolley system in New Hampshire. Trolleys could be taken south to Boston, as well as north into Manchester and to locations as far east as Hampton, New Hampshire. The trolley also connected different areas of the city, with the Nashua line ending at the city dance hall. The trolley system decreased in popularity in the 20th century, finally closing in 1932.

Future railroads 
Efforts are being made to extend the MBTA Commuter Rail's Lowell Line from Lowell to Manchester, stopping at Nashua along the way. The state legislature created the New Hampshire Rail Transit Authority (NHRTA) in 2007 with the goal of overseeing the development of commuter rail in the state. The Nashua Board of Aldermen signed a memorandum of understanding, on October 11, 2017, with the Boston Surface Railroad Company in the creation of a commuter rail line in the near future. The proposed line would connect Lowell, Massachusetts, to Bedford, New Hampshire, with the end station being near the Manchester–Boston Regional Airport. As of November, 2022, an ongoing study by AECOM and the State of New Hampshire for design and financing is due to be completed by early 2023, and the project is awaiting federal funding. Nashua is proposed to have two station stops on the line, South Nashua, which would be located behind the Pheasant Lane Mall just north of the state line, and Nashua, which would be located in a rail yard near Crown Street in downtown Nashua and would utilize the existing Crown Street park-and-ride lot.

Firefighting
In the city, there are six stations. There is one fire chief, one assistant chief, and four deputy chiefs. The department has six engines, three ladder trucks, one haz-mat/rescue truck (known as Special Hazards 1), two brush trucks, two spare engines, and one spare ladder truck. Nashua uses a private ambulance service, American Medical  Response. The department has five fire commissioners. The commission has overall responsibility for the policy decisions, promotions, discipline, hiring and terminations. The fire chief reports directly to the commission. Their responsibility is to also work with fire administration with planning and prioritizing the department budget.

Health care
There are two hospitals in Nashua, St. Joseph Hospital and Southern New Hampshire Health System.

Notable people

In popular culture
An episode of MTV's MADE was filmed in 2004 at Nashua High School North.

Russian dressing was created in Nashua by James E. Colburn, likely in the 1910s.

Sister cities 
  Mysore, Karnataka, India

See also

 Mine Falls Park
 Nashua River Rail Trail
 Greeley Park

References

External links

 

 
Cities in New Hampshire
Cities in Hillsborough County, New Hampshire
Populated places established in 1746
County seats in New Hampshire
New Hampshire populated places on the Merrimack River
New Hampshire placenames of Native American origin